This is a list of Hungarian football transfers for the 2009–10 winter transfer window by club. Only transfers of clubs in the Soproni Liga and Hungarian National Championship II are included.

The summer transfer window opened on 1 January 2010, although a few transfers may have taken place prior to that date. The window closed at midnight on 20 February 2010. Players without a club may join one at any time, either during or in between transfer windows.

Soproni Liga

Budapest Honvéd FC

In:

 

Out:

Debreceni VSC

In:

Out:

Diósgyőri VTK

In:

Out:

Ferencvárosi TC

In:

Out:

Győri ETO FC

In:

Out:

Kaposvári Rákóczi FC

In:

 

Out:

Kecskeméti TE

In:

Out:

Lombard-Pápa TFC

In:

Out:

MTK Budapest FC

In:

Out:

Nyíregyháza Spartacus

In:

 

Out:

Paksi SE

In:

Out:

Szombathelyi Haladás

In:

Out:

Újpest FC

In:

Out:

Vasas SC

In:

Out:

Videoton FC

In:

Out:

Zalaegerszegi TE

In:

Out:

See also
 List of Belgian football transfers winter 2009–10
 List of Danish football transfers winter 2009–10
 List of English football transfers winter 2009–10
 List of French football transfers winter 2010
 List of German football transfers winter 2009–10
 List of Italian football transfers winter 2009–10
 List of Latvian football transfers winter 2009–10
 List of Maltese football transfers winter 2009–10
 List of Serbian football transfers winter 2009–10
 List of Spanish football transfers winter 2009–10
 List of Swedish football transfers winter 2009–2010

References

Allsvenskan

External links
Nemzeti Sport 
Pepsifoci 

Hungarian
Transfers
2009-10